Al Tali'a (Arabic:The Vanguard) was a monthly Marxist magazine which was based in Cairo, Egypt. It was in circulation between 1965 and 1977.

History and profile
Al Tali'a was established by Michel Kamil, an Egyptian Coptic, and Lutfi Al Kholi, and the first issue appeared in January 1965. The magazine was published by the state-run Al Ahram company on a monthly basis, but its editorial was independent due to Mohammed Heikal's protection of Al Tali'a against government influence. Lutfi Al Kholi was the editor-in-chief, and Michel Kamil served as its managing editor until 1970. 

In a visit to magazine's offices in Cairo President Gamal Abdel Nasser expressed his views about the editors as follows: "Your role is like St. Peter – you’re here to do propaganda, but not to lead." Nasser's successor President Anwar Sadat dismissed Mohammed Heikal who had been the editor-in-chief of Al Ahram, and therefore, Al Tali'a lost its major defender. Following this incident the relationship of the magazine with the Sadat government became much more strained, and in 1977 it was redesigned as a youth magazine. Al Tali'a was closed down by the government in 1977, and the last issue was published in July that year.

Political stance and content
The magazine had a Marxist political stance and featured articles by the Egyptian Marxists. Al Tali'a published articles on the 1968 student movements in Egypt and in other countries written by Saad Zahran. It also adopted an anti-Zionist approach and argued that until World War II Zionism had not been an influential ideology for the Jewish people in Europe and that Jews should be reintegrated into the Arab societies. 

The topics covered in Al Tali'a were mostly about the Arab socialism and the relationships with the Soviet Union. However, it also included articles about various policies implemented in Egypt, including educational policies. The magazine was a mild critic of Gamal Abdel Nasser. Lutfi Al Kholi published many articles emphasizing the barriers against the revolution which had been included in the nationalist charter developed following the 1952 revolution in Egypt. Some of the contributors of the magazine included Mohammed Sid Ahmed and Abou Seif Youssef who also headed the magazine. They provided the ideological basis for the left-leaning leadership in the country. 

In addition to the political content Al Tali'a also featured comprehensive analyses about literary tendencies of the writers at that period. One such analysis was published in 1969 which reported the findings of a survey collected from writers and articles. From 1972 Al Tali'a published a literary supplement of which the editor was Yahya Haqqi who had been fired from the editorship of the cultural magazine Al Majalla in 1970.

References

External links

1965 establishments in Egypt
1977 disestablishments in Egypt
Arabic-language magazines
Censorship in Egypt
Defunct political magazines published in Egypt
Magazines established in 1965
Magazines disestablished in 1977
Magazines published in Cairo
Marxist magazines
Monthly magazines published in Egypt
Propaganda newspapers and magazines
State media
Youth magazines